Prathersville is an unincorporated community in Boone County, in the U.S. state of Missouri. Prathersville was named after William Prather, a local merchant. It is located in north Columbia.

References

Unincorporated communities in Boone County, Missouri
Unincorporated communities in Missouri